Nathan Sproul is a Republican strategist and political consultant for numerous election campaigns. Sproul is the managing director of Lincoln Strategy Group, an international political consulting firm based in Arizona. He is a former executive director of the Arizona Republican Party and the Arizona Christian Coalition.

Education
He is a 1994 magna Cum Laude graduate of Pillsbury Baptist Bible College and has a Pastoral degree.

Nathan and his wife Tiffani (née Smith) graduated from high school at Tri-City Christian Academy in Tempe, Arizona. They reside in Chandler, Arizona with their triplets.

Career
Nathan started his career as an intern for the Republican National Committee. In 1997, Nathan went to work for the Arizona Christian Coalition.

He served as the executive director of the Arizona Republican Party from 1999 to 2002.

Nathan started his own firm, Sproul & Associates in 2004. Also in 2004, he worked with the effort of removing the Arizona Clean Elections law formed in the spring by Representative Jeff Flake, an Arizona Republican. The ballot initiative would have essentially repealed Arizona's Clean Elections campaign finance system. Sproul was hired by No Taxpayer Money for Politicians to conduct a signature drive to get the anti-Clean Elections bill on the ballot. It failed its single subject challenge, with Attorney Lisa Hauser representing the inititiative.

Also during the 2004 election, it was alleged that Sproul's company had set up voter registration drives on their premises under the name "America Votes", a name already claimed by a large, progressive organization.

According to a 2005 Baltimore Chronicle article, the Republican Party had paid Nathan Sproul $8,359,161, and alleged this is far more than what had been reported to the FEC.

Sproul & Associates
In 2004, the voter registration firm Sproul & Associates defended itself from accusations that it was discarding the registration forms of Democrats after a past employee provided KLAS-TV with shredded forms and claimed this discarding was done as a matter of routine. Countering the allegation, Sproul & Associates proved that some Democratic voter registrations had been properly submitted.

See also

 Voters Outreach of America
 America Votes

References

External links
 Lincoln Strategy Group
 

Year of birth missing (living people)
Living people
University of Phoenix alumni
American political consultants
Arizona Republicans